Pedro Piñeda (born 3 December 1954) is a Guatemalan former wrestler who competed in the 1972 Summer Olympics.

References

External links
 

1954 births
Living people
Olympic wrestlers of Guatemala
Wrestlers at the 1972 Summer Olympics
Guatemalan male sport wrestlers
Place of birth missing (living people)